Bedchester is a hamlet in the civil parish of Fontmell Magna, in Dorset, England.

A sign for Bedchester can be briefly seen in The Only Fools and Horses episode, A Touch of Glass.

External links

Hamlets in Dorset